One of the most outstanding phases of W. G. Grace’s career occurred in the 1876 season, beginning with his career highest score of 344 for MCC v Kent at Canterbury in August.  Two days after his innings at Canterbury, he made 177 for Gloucestershire v Nottinghamshire; and two days after that 318 not out for Gloucestershire v Yorkshire, these two innings against counties with exceptionally strong bowling attacks including Alfred Shaw, Fred Morley, Tom Emmett and Allen Hill. Thus, in three consecutive innings Grace scored 839 runs and was only out twice.

His innings of 344 was the first triple century scored in first-class cricket and broke the record for the highest individual score in all classes of cricket, previously held by William Ward who made 278 in 1820.  Ward’s record had stood for 56 years and, within a week, Grace bettered it twice. Gloucestershire were designated “Champion County” for the second time. Grace made 26 first-class appearances in 1876, scoring 2,622 runs, with a highest score of 344, at an average of 62.42 with 7 centuries and 10 half-centuries. In the field, he held 46 catches and 130 wickets with a best analysis of 8–69. His bowling average was 19.05; he had 5 wickets in an innings 11 times and 10 wickets in a match twice.

In 1877, Gloucestershire were designated “Champion County” for the third and (to date) final time, largely thanks to another outstanding season by Grace. Grace made 24 first-class appearances in 1877, scoring 1,474 runs, with a highest score of 261, at an average of 39.83 with 2 centuries and 9 half-centuries. In the field, he took 37 catches and 179 wickets with a best analysis of 9–55. His bowling average was 12.81; he had 5 wickets in an innings 17 times and 10 wickets in a match 7 times.

References

External links
 CricketArchive – W.G. Grace

Bibliography

 
 
 
 
 
 
 
 
 

English cricket seasons in the 19th century
1876